Neelkanth Ganjoo (Assassinated on 4 November 1989) was a high court judge in Kashmir.

About 
In the late 1960s, as a sessions court judge, he had presided over the trial of JKLF founder Maqbool Bhat in the murder of police inspector Amar Chand in 1966. In August 1968, he sentenced Bhat and one other to death. This sentence was upheld by the Supreme Court in 1982.

In 1984, after JKLF cadres in Britain murdered diplomat Ravindra Mhatre, Bhat's execution was carried out in Tihar jail. The same year, some militants bombed Ganjoo's house. On 4 November 1989, three militants surrounded Ganjoo as he was in the Hari Singh Street market and shot him dead. near the High Court in Srinagar.

References

20th-century Indian judges
1989 deaths
People from Jammu and Kashmir
1922 births
Assassinations in India
Deaths by firearm in India
1989 murders in Asia